Simon Alexandersson (born 23 November 1992) is a Swedish footballer. Alexandersson was recruited by Norwegian club Kristiansund BK in 2018, and was loaned to Dalkurd FF in February of 2019. He joined Östers in December 2019.

References

External links 
 
 

Swedish footballers
Allsvenskan players
Superettan players
Eliteserien players
1992 births
Living people
Harlow Town F.C. players
Vimmerby IF players
Åtvidabergs FF players
AFC Eskilstuna players
IK Brage players
Kristiansund BK players
Dalkurd FF players
Östers IF players
GAIS players
Swedish expatriate footballers
Expatriate footballers in Norway
Association football forwards